Carson W. "Bill" Beck (born March 21, 1962) is a member of the Tennessee House of Representatives.

Biography 
He was raised in Madison, Tennessee, and Whites Creek, Tennessee, by his parents, Mr. and Mrs. Beck. Bill Beck attended Belmont University, where he received his bachelor's degree in business administration in 1985. Then, he attended the Nashville School of Law and earned his doctor of jurisprudence degree in 1989. After graduating from Belmont, Beck served in the Tennessee Air National Guard, and he started two successful businesses in home building and real estate. He also went into business with his mother, Martha Lu Cone Beck, practicing law as partners.

Representation 
Beck is a member of seven committees: Judiciary, Civil Justice Subcommittee, State Committee, Departments & Agencies Subcommittee, Naming, Designating, & Private Acts Committee, Select Ethics Committee, and the Joint Fiscal Review Committee. Beck represents Tennessee's 51st District. He has held over eight town hall meetings for community input and response.

Sponsored and co-sponsored bills

References

1962 births
Living people
Democratic Party members of the Tennessee House of Representatives
21st-century American politicians